Pseudorasbora pugnax is a species of cyprinid fish endemic to Honshu, Japan.

References

Pseudorasbora
Freshwater fish of Japan
Endemic fauna of Japan
Fish described in 2015
Taxa named by Seigo Kawase
Taxa named by Kazumi Hosoya